H2O is the eleventh studio album by American pop rock duo Daryl Hall & John Oates, released on October 4, 1982, by RCA Records. It peaked at number three on the Billboard 200, making it the duo's highest-charting album, and has been certified double platinum by the Recording Industry Association of America (RIAA) with sales of over two million copies. The album title is a play on the chemical formula for water, where "H" is for Hall and "O" is for Oates. It features three US top-10 singles, including "Maneater", the most successful single of their career, spending four weeks at number one on the Billboard Hot 100. The album marks the first appearance for longtime bassist and musical director Tom "T-Bone" Wolk.

Commercial performance
The album debuted at number 42 on the Billboard 200 the week of October 30, 1982, as the highest debut of the week; 11 weeks later, it peaked at number three on the chart on January 15, 1983; the album spent 68 weeks on the chart. By December 1982, the album sold one million copies and it was certified platinum on December 16, 1982; it was certified double platinum by the Recording Industry Association of America (RIAA) on April 1, 1985, denoting shipments in excess of two million copies.

In the United Kingdom, the album opened at number 31 on October 23, 1982, peaking at number 24 the following week. The album remained on the chart for 35 weeks and was certified Gold by the British Phonographic Industry (BPI) on March 29, 1983, for shipments of 100,000.

Track listing

Personnel 
 Daryl Hall – lead vocals (1-6, 8, 9, 11), backing vocals, keyboards, synthesizers, guitars 
 John Oates – backing vocals, lead vocals (7, 10), 6-string and 12-string guitars, electric piano, Roland CR-78, Linn LM-1
 Larry Fast – synthesizer programming
 G.E. Smith – lead guitars
 Tom "T-Bone" Wolk – bass
 Mickey Curry – drums, percussion 
 Charlie "Mr. Casual" DeChant – saxophone
 "Little Italy Mandolinos" – Daryl Hall, John Oates and Tom "T-Bone" Wolk

Production 
 Produced by Daryl Hall and John Oates
 Engineered and co-produced by Neil Kernon
 Assistant engineers – Bruce Buchalter, Barry Harris and Michael Somers-Abbott.
 Recorded at Electric Lady Studios (New York, NY).
 Mixed by Hugh Padgham
 Mastered by Bob Ludwig at Masterdisk (New York, NY).
 Art direction and design – Mick Haggerty and Geoffrey Kent
 Cover photography – Hiro
 Inner sleeve photography – Larry Williams

Charts

Weekly charts

Year-end charts

Certifications

Notes

References

Bibliography

 

1982 albums
Albums produced by Neil Kernon
Hall & Oates albums
RCA Records albums